Pachypteris (Brongn.) T.M.Harris. is a Mesozoic pteridosperm leaf fossil probably belonging to the seed fern Order Peltaspermales.

Description 
Pachypteris is represented by hypostomatic, bipinnate or unipinnate leaves, with alethopteridian venation (midvein and secondary veins divided once or twice before reaching the pinnule margin), pinnules with entire margins and rounded apices. The stomata are haplocheilic, monocyclic or dicyclic, usually depressed, with the guard cells occurring in the lowermost part of the stoma.

Taxonomy 
The affinities of Pachypteris lay with Cycadopteris, Komlopteris, Dicroidium (a typical Corystospermalean foliage) and Ptilozamites. It includes the former denomination Thinnfeldia Ettingshausen 1852, a junior synonym of Pachypteris, as Doludenko (1971)  showed. The genus was detailed by Harris (1964), Doludenko (1974), Schweitzer and Kirchner (1998), Popa (2000), and Gordenko (2007). The genus Komlopteris, a segregate from Pachypteris, was defined by Barbacka (1994).

Pachypteris includes about 20 species ranging from late Triassic to Lower Cretaceous, such as P. speciosa, P. rhomboidalis, P. gradinarui, etc. This genus is mainly a boreal taxon, being extensively reported in Europe, Iran, Afghanistan, China and North America, but it has been cited from Gondwanic occurrences as well, such as India, Argentina and Australia.

Distribution 
Fossils of Pachypteris have been registered in:

Triassic
Brazil, China, Germany, Japan, and the Russian Federation

Jurassic
Antarctica, Argentina, Australia, Colombia (Valle Alto Formation, Caldas), France, Georgia, India, Iran, Italy, Japan, Lithuania, Norway, Poland, Romania, the Russian Federation, Serbia and Montenegro, Tajikistan, the United Kingdom, and Uzbekistan.

Cretaceous
Argentina

References 

Pteridospermatophyta
Early Triassic genus first appearances
Olenekian genera
Anisian genera
Ladinian genera
Carnian genera
Norian genera
Rhaetian genera
Hettangian genera
Sinemurian genera
Pliensbachian genera
Toarcian genera
Aalenian genera
Bajocian genera
Bathonian genera
Callovian genera
Oxfordian genera
Kimmeridgian genera
Tithonian genera
Berriasian genera
Valanginian genera
Hauterivian genera
Barremian genera
Aptian genera
Albian genera
Cenomanian genera
Triassic plants
Jurassic plants
Early Cretaceous plants
Late Cretaceous plants
Late Cretaceous genus extinctions
Mesozoic Antarctica
Mesozoic life of Asia
Mesozoic life of Europe
Mesozoic life of South America
Prehistoric plants of South America
Triassic Brazil
Fossils of Brazil
Jurassic Argentina
Cretaceous Argentina
Fossils of Argentina
Jurassic Colombia
Fossils of Colombia
Fossil taxa described in 1828
Fossils of Serbia